The 2016 Rally Islas Canarias was the first round of the 2016 European Rally Championship season, held in the Canary Islands between 10-12 March 2016.

The rally was won by Alexey Lukyanuk for him to lead the championship, and it continued his winning streak from the last event of the 2015 season. The WRC rally-winner and current Ford works driver Mads Østberg retired early on his ERC début after having led from stage one. In the latter stages, the field was headed by a non-registered local competitor, Enrique Cruz, who won this rally outright, so Lukyanuk won the ERC portion of the event. The WRC-2 winner was Wojciech Chuchala. The WRC-3 winner was Lukasz Habaj. The ERC ladies winner was Emma Falcon.

Results

References
Final Results on ewrc-results.com
Point distribution at ERC 2016

2016 in Spanish motorsport
2016 European Rally Championship season
Rally Islas Canarias